The Tracy Transit Center is a bus station in Tracy, California, United States. The facility serves as a bus hub for transportation on local, commuter, and long-distance bus services. It also replaced the Naglee Park and Ride Lot "as the place for people to meet buses and vanpools" when the Naglee lot was sold for development in spring 2017, "after the city’s negotiations with several shopping centers near Interstate 205 proved unsuccessful."

Tracer and taxi services offer local connections. Greyhound Lines also provides bus service to the transit center. Parking is offered for both bikes and vehicles and there are bus shelters and stops for transit. Although located in very close proximity to railroad tracks, there is currently no rail service to the transit center; Valley Link service is proposed to stop at a newly constructed train platform adjacent to the station.

While service may have been previously provided at the transit center, as of July 2013 Amtrak Thruway Motorcoach only has two stops in Tracy (at the Tracy Altamont Corridor Express station and at a Wendy's restaurant), but not at the Tracy Transit Center.

References

External links

Google maps
3D Model

Tracy, California
Bus stations in San Joaquin County, California
Transport infrastructure completed in 2010
2010 establishments in California
Proposed railway stations in the United States
Railway stations scheduled to open in 2028
Future Valley Link stations